Eucalyptus jacksonii, commonly known as the red tingle, is a species of tall tree endemic to the southwest of Western Australia and is one of the tallest trees found in the state. It has thick, rough, stringy reddish bark from the base of the trunk to the thinnest branches, egg-shaped to lance-shaped adult leaves, flower buds in groups of seven, white flowers and shortened spherical to barrel-shaped fruit.

Description
The crown is dense and compact, forming a heavy canopy. Flowering occurs between January and March and the flowers are white.

The trees often have shallow root systems and grow a buttressed base.

One specimen, known as the "Giant Tingle Tree" is a tourist attraction in the Walpole-Nornalup National Park near Walpole. Its base has been hollowed by fire and it is claimed to have the largest girth of any living eucalypt.

The red tingle is often compared to the other two species - the yellow tingle (Eucalyptus guilfoylei) and Rate's tingle (Eucalyptus brevistylis) are smaller. The red tingle is more closely related to Rate's tingle, both of which belong to the subgenus Eucalyptus.

Taxonomy and naming
The species was first described by the botanist Joseph Maiden in 1914 in the Journal and Proceedings of the Royal Society of New South Wales. Eucalyptus jacksonii is named after Sidney William Jackson, an Australian naturalist and ornithologist. Jackson collected the specimens used by Maiden near the "Deep River", Nornalup Inlet and "Bow River", Irwin's Inlet.

Distribution and habitat
The distribution of the species has been shrinking due to climate change over millions of years. They are now found primarily in Walpole-Nornalup National Park and in a few isolated sites outside the park in the Walpole area at the juncture of the South West and Great Southern regions along the south coast of Western Australia where it grows on hillsides and in gullies in loamy soils.

The trees often occur with Eucalyptus marginata (jarrah) and Eucalyptus diversicolor (karri) and Corymbia calophylla (marri) trees. The red tingle also can occur with Eucalyptus guilfoylei (yellow tingle) and Eucalyptus brevistylis (Rate's tingle) and are the dominant species in the stands in which they occur.

Gallery

See also
 List of Eucalyptus species

References

External links
Forest Product Commission web page 

Trees of Australia
Trees of Mediterranean climate
jacksonii
Myrtales of Australia
Eucalypts of Western Australia
Plants described in 1913
Taxa named by Joseph Maiden
Endemic flora of Southwest Australia